Nerchau is a town and a former municipality in the Leipzig district, in the Free State of Saxony, Germany. Since 1 January 2011, it is a part (Ortschaft) of the town Grimma. It is situated on the river Mulde, 7 km northeast of Grimma, and 30 km east of Leipzig (centre).

Events
 Schützenfest (July/August)
 Mulde Regatta (August)
 Mulde Valley half marathon (April)

History and Economy
Nerchau is known for its paint factory which was established by the Hessel brothers in 1834. By 1880 it employed over 100 people. In 1945 the paint factory was nationalized by East Germany. 
After German Reunification the factory was sold a number of times and now belongs to Schoenfeld GmbH (Düsseldorf), which produces artists' paints Lukas since 1862. 
The town has suffered from depopulation in recent years.
In January 2013 Daler-Rowney purchased Lukas and Nerchau, two German brands, with the intention of developing them further in their home country and far further afield.
In February 2016, Daler-Rowney was acquired by the Milan-based F.I.L.A. Group, who also owns the U.S. Dixon Ticonderoga Company.

Transport
The Autobahn A 14 runs nearby.

Famous people
 The Kessler Twins (Alice and Ellen, b. 1936), dancers, actresses and entertainers
 Thomas Grimm (b. 1973), swimmer, participant in the paralympic games

References

External links

Former municipalities in Saxony
Grimma